The 1936 Kentucky Wildcats football team was an American football team that represented the University of Kentucky as a member of the Southeastern Conference (SEC) during the 1936 college football season. In their third season under head coach Chet A. Wynne, the Wildcats compiled an overall record of 6–4 record with a mark of 1–3 against conference opponents, tied for ninth place in the SEC, and outscored opponents by a total of 179 to 84. The team played its home games at McLean Stadium in Lexington, Kentucky.

Schedule

References

Kentucky
Kentucky Wildcats football seasons
Kentucky Wildcats football